Tengku Sarafudin Badlishah ibni Al-Aminul Karim Sultan Sallehuddin (born 2 March 1967) is the current Raja Muda (Crown Prince) of Kedah. He was proclaimed as Raja Muda of Kedah on 26 November 2017, upon the accession of his father, Sultan Sallehuddin ibni Almarhum Sultan Badlishah as the 29th Sultan of Kedah.

Biography
Tengku Sarafudin Badlishah was born on 2 March 1967 in Alor Setar, Kedah. He is the eldest son of Sultan Sallehuddin ibni Sultan Badlishah and Sultanah Maliha binti Tengku Ariff. Sultan Sallehuddin ibni Sultan Badlishah was the seventh son of the Sultan of Kedah, Sultan Badlishah and Sultanah Asma, the Sultanah of Kedah. Tengku Sarafudin has one younger brother, Tunku Shazuddin Ariff, who is the current Tunku Mahkota of Kedah.

Tengku Sarafuddin attended the Royal Military Academy at Sungei Besi and continued with legal studies at Holborn College London. He graduated from Brunel University London with a Bachelor of Laws (Hons) degree in 1990. He received his Barrister at Law (Inner Temple) UK appointment and was admitted in the High Court of Malaya as an advocate and solicitor in 1994.

Tunku Laksamana of Kedah
Tengku Sarafudin previously became the Tunku Laksamana of Kedah before being proclaimed as the Raja Muda of Kedah. He was succeeded as Tunku Laksamana by his younger brother, Tunku Shazudin Ariff.

Raja Muda of Kedah
Tengku Sarafudin was proclaimed as Raja Muda of Kedah on 26 November 2017, upon the accession of his father, Sultan Sallehuddin ibni Almarhum Sultan Badlishah as the 29th Sultan of Kedah.

As Raja Muda, Tengku Sarafudin holds a number of important positions including as chancellor of the Management and Science University and president of the Kedah Islamic Religious Council.

Personal life
Tengku Sarafudin is married to a commoner Che Puan Muda Zaheeda Mohamad Ariff, who became the Raja Puan Muda (Crown Princess) of Kedah in 2017. The couple have two children:
 Tunku Zara Bahiyah (born 11 April 2004). 
 Tunku Sulaiman Badlishah (born 18 December 2007).

Children and their date of birth

Honours
  :
 Knight Companion of the Order of Loyalty to the Royal House of Kedah (DSDK) – Dato' (21 January 2007)
 Golden Jubilee Medal (15 July 2008)
  Member of the Supreme Order of Sri Mahawangsa (DMK) – Dato' Seri Utama (26 November 2017)
  Member of the Royal Family Order of Kedah (DK) (19 June 2022)

Ancestry

References

Royal House of Kedah
1967 births
Living people
People from Kedah
Malaysian Muslims
Malaysian people of Malay descent
Sons of monarchs